Noel John Tanzer,  (born 16 November 1931) is a retired senior Australian public servant and policymaker.

Life and career
Noel Tanzer was born on 16 November 1931.

Tanzer began his career in the Commonwealth Public Service in 1949, serving for 17 years in Brisbane.

In 1980 and 1981 he was serving as a senior assistant commissioner in the management systems and efficiency division of the Public Service Board.

Tanzer was appointed Secretary of the Department of Veterans' Affairs in 1986. Immediately prior to his Veterans' Affairs appointment, he had been a Deputy Secretary in the Department of Social Security.

He moved to the Department of Administrative Services in 1989. His task was to have the department operate in accordance with commercial principles. He also aimed to improve departmental services to customers. He restructured 17 separate departmental units into four programs, and offered redundancy packages to downsize the department, reducing staffing numbers by more than 1000. The new structure Tanzer established saw much of the department run on commercial lines and funded on a trust-account basis.

Tanzer retired from the public service in 1993, his final appointment was as Secretary of the Department of the Arts and Administrative Services. As head of the Department, he was responsible for handling more than $2 billion in revenue.

In 1994, Tanzer was appointed as a consultant to the law firm Mallesons Stephen Jaques.

Awards
Tanzer was made a Companion of the Order of Australia in 1994.

References

Australian public servants
Living people
1931 births
Companions of the Order of Australia
Secretaries of the Australian Government Veterans' Affairs Department